Blue Bottle Coffee, Inc., is a coffee roaster and retailer once headquartered in Oakland, California, United States. In 2017, a majority stake in the company was acquired by Nestlé (68%). It is considered a major player in third wave coffee. The company focuses on single-origin beans.

Locations
The company once based in Oakland, California, soon expanded to other areas around the country. Blue Bottle first expanded to several cafés in locations around San Francisco, including the Ferry Building and the San Francisco Museum of Modern Art's rooftop garden. The company operates 99 stores as of June 2021, with locations in California, New York, Washington, D.C., Boston, Chicago, Seoul, Kyoto, Kobe, Tokyo, Hong Kong, and Yokohama.

History

W. James Freeman founded Blue Bottle Coffee in the early 2000s in Oakland’s Temescal District. Freeman borrowed the name from one of Europe's first cafés, The Blue Bottle Coffee House. His intention was to roast coffee in small batches (6 lbs. per roast) to sell within 24 hours of roasting, initially as a home-delivery service. Blue Bottle soon ceased deliveries and opened as a traditional café.

Blue Bottle opened additional locations in San Francisco and elsewhere in the San Francisco Bay Area, and then opened its first New York location in Williamsburg, Brooklyn, in 2010. The company-owned stores carry off-menu items such as the "Gibraltar", a form of cortado.

In 2012, Blue Bottle received $20 million in venture capital investment.

In January 2014, Blue Bottle raised $25.75 million in new round of funding.

In 2015, Blue Bottle completed a venture capital round in which it raised $70 million from investors led by Fidelity.

Since its inception, the company has raised $120 million from investors as of 2017.

In February 2015, Blue Bottle Coffee opened its first location in Tokyo, Japan, in the Kiyosumi neighborhood.

In September 2017, Nestle S.A., the world's largest food and drinks company, acquired a majority stake of Blue Bottle. While the deal's financial details were not disclosed, the Financial Times reported "Nestle is understood to be paying up to $500m for the 68 per cent stake in Blue Bottle". Blue Bottle expected to increase sales by 70% in 2017.

In May 2019, Blue Bottle Coffee opened its first location in Seoul, South Korea.

In December 2019, Blue Bottle Coffee announced they would test eliminating disposable cups at some of their shops in an effort to increase sustainability efforts, with the goal being zero waste within one year. nothing has been reported to date about this test and whether it was successful.

In April 2020, Blue Bottle Coffee opened its first location in Central, Hong Kong. Amid COVID-19, the café opened from 8 a.m. to 5 p.m. daily for takeaway only.

In February 2022, Blue Bottle Coffee opened its first location in mainland China, Yutong Cafe. Yutong Cafe is located at a historic building by Suzhou Creek in downtown Shanghai.

See also 

 Counter Culture Coffee
 Intelligentsia Coffee & Tea
 La Colombe Coffee Roasters
 Revelator Coffee
 Stumptown Coffee Roasters
 List of coffeehouse chains
 List of coffee companies

References

External links
 

Coffeehouses and cafés in the United States
Companies based in Oakland, California
Food and drink in the San Francisco Bay Area
Drink companies based in California
Nestlé brands
Food and drink companies established in 2002
American companies established in 2002